Ossi may refer to:

Organizations
 Open Source Seed Initiative, dedicated to maintaining access to plant genetic resources
 Open Source Software Institute, promoter of open-source software solutions in the US Federal, state and municipal government agencies
 Organisation of Serbian Students Abroad

People
 Ossi (East Germans), a nickname given to former residents of the country East Germany (GDR)
 Ossian Ossi Blomqvist (1908–1955), Finnish speed skater
 Oskar "Ossi" Bonde (born 1979), the drummer of the rock band Johnossi
 Ossi Kauppi (1929–2000), Finnish ice hockey player
 Ossi Oikarinen (born 1970), Finnish engineer who works in Formula One
 Ossi Oswalda (1899–1948), German silent film actress
 Ossi Reichert (1925–2006), German Alpine skier
 Ossi Runne (1927–2020), Finnish conductor and composer
 Ossi Sandvik (born 1953), Finnish politician

Other uses
 Order of the Star of Italian Solidarity
 Ossi, Sardinia, a city in the province of Sassari, Sardinia

See also
 Ossie, a given name
 Ozzie, a given name